Elkins Construction LLC is a privately held construction corporation headquartered in Jacksonville, Florida. It was created in 2015 by Wayne McCall and Barry Allred when Elkins Constructors, founded in 1955 by Martin Elkins, closed down. Wayne McCall, also president of Perry-McCall Construction stated that the two companies would compete and work together on larger projects. Elkins moved from their downtown offices near the Jacksonville Courthouse to the building where Perry-McCall was located on the Southside.

The original company was purchased in 1984 by a group of investors that included then current CEO Allred. The company was one of Florida's largest privately held construction companies and the builder of choice for Lowe's. They perform general contracting, Design/build, and Construction management services for commercial, industrial, multi-family residential, institutional, and retail projects. Elkins Constructors, Inc. constructed 49 Lowe's Home Centers, 24 Wal-Mart Supercenters, 4 Kohls Department Stores, 2 Winn Dixie Supermarkets and 2 Stein Mart Department Stores, all in the southeast US.

In addition to the aforementioned, their industry segments included condominiums, healthcare, education, church and senior living facilities. The Engineering News-Record magazine ranked Elkins Constructors Inc. as No. 28 in its Top 50 Green Contractors for 2007 (US) list.

References

External links
Official website

Companies based in Jacksonville, Florida
Privately held companies based in Florida
Construction and civil engineering companies of the United States
Construction and civil engineering companies established in 1955
Architecture firms based in Jacksonville
1955 establishments in Florida